uMlalazi Local Municipality is an administrative area in the King Cetshwayo District of KwaZulu-Natal in South Africa. The municipality is named after the uMlalazi River.

Main places
The 2001 census divided the municipality into the following main places:

Politics 

The municipal council consists of fifty-five members elected by mixed-member proportional representation. Twenty-eight councillors are elected by first-past-the-post voting in twenty-eight wards, while the remaining twenty-seven are chosen from party lists so that the total number of party representatives is proportional to the number of votes received. In the election of 1 November 2021 the Inkatha Freedom Party (IFP) won a majority of thirty seats on the council.
The following table shows the results of the election.

References

External links
 

Local municipalities of the King Cetshwayo District Municipality